Denny Martin Flinn (December 21, 1947 – August 24, 2007) was an American writer, choreographer, stage director and actor with numerous Broadway credits. He co-wrote the screenplay for Star Trek VI: The Undiscovered Country (1991).

Biography
Flinn grew up in California, spending his early life in the cities of Los Angeles and San Francisco. He attended the San Francisco State University, his academic major being theatre. While still in college, Flinn performed as a dancer in North Beach, San Francisco. He later moved to New York City, where he found employment as an actor, dancer, and choreographer. His Broadway theatre credits include the original musical Sugar (1972), and revivals of Hello, Dolly! (1975) and Pal Joey (1976). His Off-Broadway credits include the choreography of Six (1971) by Charles Strouse. He also performed in the national tour of Fiddler on the Roof. He also was in the short lived 1978 musical Barbary Coast. In the 80s Flinn toured with the national company of A Chorus Line in the roles of both Zack and Greg.

Flinn later wrote and directed his own Off-Broadway musical: Groucho (1979), starring Lewis J. Stadlen. He choreographed musical sequences for the films The Deceivers (1988) and Ghost (1990), and the television series Another World and Search for Tomorrow.

Flinn wrote the 1989 book What They Did for Love: The Untold Story Behind the Making of A Chorus Line, covering the story behind the production of the 1970s musical A Chorus Line. He next turned to mystery fiction, writing the novels San Francisco Kills (1990) and Killer Finish (1991). He and Nicholas Meyer co-wrote the script of Star Trek VI: The Undiscovered Country (1991). Flinn also wrote The Fearful Summons (1995), a Star Trek novel. His research work Musical! A Grand Tour – the Rise, Glory and Fall of an American Institution (1997) won an ASCAP Deems Taylor Award. His later output consisted of non-fiction books such as How Not To Write a Screenplay: 101 Common Mistakes Most Screenwriters Make (1999) and How Not To Audition: Avoiding the Common Mistakes Most Actors Make (2003).

Death
Flinn died in Woodland Hills, Los Angeles due to "complications from cancer". He was survived by a wife and two children.

Filmography
Star Trek VI: The Undiscovered Country (1991) (co-writer)
The Deceivers (1988) (choreographer)

Bibliography

Non-Fiction
The Great American Book Musical: A Manifesto, Monograph, and Manual (Limelight Editions 2008) 
Ready for My Close-up!: Great Movie Monologues (Limelight Editions 2007) 
Little Musicals for Little Theaters (Limelight Editions 2006) 
How Not to Write a Screenplay: 101 Common Mistakes Most Screenwriters Make (Lone Eagle Publishing 1999) 
Musical!: A Grand Tour  (Wadsworth Publishing 1997) 
What They Did for Love: The Untold Story Behind the Making of a Chorus Line (Bantam Dell Pub Group 1989) 
Co-authored:
How Not to Audition: Avoiding the Common Mistakes Most Actors Make (with Ellie Kanner) (Lone Eagle Publishing 2003)

Fiction
Fearful Summons (Star Trek) (name 1995) 
Killer Finish (Bantam Books 1991) 
San Francisco Kills (Bantam Books 1991)

References

External links

His article in Memory Alpha

1947 births
2007 deaths
Writers of books about writing fiction
American male screenwriters
20th-century American novelists
21st-century American writers
Deaths from cancer in California
American male novelists
20th-century American male writers
Screenwriting instructors
Screenwriters from California
20th-century American screenwriters